This is a list of Turkey international footballers – football players who have played for the Turkey national football team. All players with 25 or more official caps are listed here.

List of players

Key to positions
 GK - Goalkeeper
 DF - Defender
 MF - Midfielder
 FW - Forward
 Bold - currently available for selection.

See also
:Category:Turkey international footballers

References

External links
 RSSSF 

 
Association football player non-biographical articles